Kiki is a 1932 French-German musical comedy film directed by Carl Lamac and starring Anny Ondra, Hermann Thimig and Berthe Ostyn. The film's sets were designed by the art director Heinz Fenchel. A separate French-language version was made, also starring Ondra.

Cast

References

Bibliography

External links 
 

1932 films
1932 multilingual films
1932 musical comedy films
Films directed by Karel Lamač
Films of the Weimar Republic
French black-and-white films
French musical comedy films
German black-and-white films
German multilingual films
German musical comedy films
1930s German-language films
1930s German films
1930s French films